The Vietnam Futsal League is the top league for Futsal in Vietnam. The winning team obtains the participation right to the AFC Futsal Club Championship.

History
In 2007, Ho Chi Minh City Football Federation launched All Vietnam Futsal Championship (Vietnamese: Giải Futsal vô địch toàn quốc) aiming to develop futsal in Vietnam. In 2009, VFF announced to take control the competition. In 2015, the competition ran in league format and changed name into Vietnam Futsal League and it has been divided into 2 stages: First-stage will be runs by 10 teams and Second-stage will run by top 8 best team in First-stage. Top 6 best team in second-stage will join the second-stage in next edition automatically

Since 2017, there are 5 teams in first-stage and 10 teams in second-stage conclude 4 qualified teams from first-stage.

HD Bank is the main sponsored so it is also called as HD Bank Vietnam Futsal League (Vietnamese: Giải Futsal Vô địch Quốc gia cúp HD Bank)

Clubs

Competition of 10 clubs in 2019 league second-stage:

1.: In 2008, the club's name was Tâm Nhật Minh and location is Ho Chi Minh City. Since 2013, the club's name has been changed to Sanatech Khánh Hòa and location is Khánh Hòa.

Championship history

Vietnam Futsal League

All Vietnam Futsal Championship

Ho Chi Minh City Futsal Championship (Unofficial)

Vietnam Women's Futsal Championship

License Broadcast Marketing Official

Digital New media

References

futsal
Top level futsal leagues in Asia
1
Sports leagues established in 2009
2009 establishments in Vietnam